Ted Sator (born November 18, 1949) is an American professional ice hockey coach. He has twelve seasons of National Hockey League (NHL) coaching experience, serving as an assistant coach for various teams and head coach of the New York Rangers and Buffalo Sabres. He has also spent time coaching in the American Hockey League (AHL) and ECHL along with coaching in Europe including stints as the Slovenian and Hungarian national ice hockey teams. He is a current assistant men's ice hockey coach at Lindenwood University.

Playing career 
Sator played college hockey for Bowling Green State University. During his senior year, the 1971–72 season, for the Falcons, Sator played 27 games, where he tallied 5 goals and assisted on 6 others; helping the Falcons finish the season with a record of 21-10-2. He was also selected to play with the U.S. World Team in Lake Placid, New York. Following his collegiate career, Sator joined the Long Island Ducks of the Eastern Hockey League (EHL) in the following year. Sator's playing career came to an end due to a knee injury after only playing three games for the Ducks.

Coaching career

Professional coaching career 
Sator began his coaching career in the early 1980s, serving as head coach of Rögle BK for the 1982-83 season in the Swedish Division 1 league. That same year he also spent time as a scout for the Philadelphia Flyers of the National Hockey League. Sator joined the Flyers coaching staff the following season, becoming assistant coach under head coach Bob McCammon during the 1983-84 season and head coach Mike Keenan during the 1984–85 season.

Sator was named head coach of the New York Rangers in 1985 and led the team to the Conference Finals in his first year when the team lost to the eventual Stanley Cup Champion Montreal Canadiens.  The following season, General Manager Craig Patrick was replaced by Phil Esposito and after only 23 games into the season Sator was replaced by Tom Webster. Sator quickly found a new position when he became head coach of the Buffalo Sabres the following year. In his first full season with the Buffalo Sabres they achieved the biggest point improvement in the NHL.  He coached them to two third-place finishes but was unable to get the team past the Stanley Cup finalist Boston Bruins in the first round of the Stanley Cup playoffs, and was relieved of his coaching duties in 1989.

Over the next two seasons, Sator was an assistant coach with the Boston Bruins before traveling to Italy to become head coach of the HC Devils Milano of the Serie A in 1991. Sator's team went undefeated on in his first season as head coach of the Devils and won the Serie A championship. Sator led the Devils to back-to-back Serie A league championships when the team won again in 1993. Sator returned to the United States and NHL the following season, taking an assistant coaching position with the St. Louis Blues. After two seasons in St. Louis, Sator spent the next two seasons as assistant coach of the Hartford Whalers, and Vancouver Canucks (where he split time between Vancouver and the Canucks American Hockey League farm team, the Syracuse Crunch.  Beginning in 1997, Sator began a successful five year coaching stint with the New Orleans Brass, where he was also Director of Player Personnel. During his tenure with the Brass, the team made the ECHL playoffs every season and never had a losing season record.

Sator returned to Europe after the Brass folded in 2002. Sator became the head coach of the Espoo Blues in the SM-liiga for the 2003-2004 season. From 2007 to 2009 he served as head coach of the Hungarian Austrian Hockey League team Alba Volán Székesfehérvár. In 2009, he was hired as head coach of the KHL Medveščak, based in Zagreb, Croatia. In the team's first season in the Austrian Hockey League the team qualified for last Playoff seed. The team stunned top seeded Graz 99ers in the Quarterfinals, winning the series in six games, before suffering elimination to eventual champions EC Red Bull Salzburg in the semi-finals.

Amateur and collegiate coaching career 
Sator then moved back to St. Louis, Missouri in 2011 and became assistant hockey coach for Lafayette High School, located in Wildwood, Missouri. For the 2011-2012 season Sator was hired as assistant coach of the Lindenwood University men's ice hockey team. He joins the team under head coach Rick Zombo, a former NHL defenseman who played for the St. Louis Blues during Sator's tenure as assistant coach for the Blues in the early 1990s.

International coaching career 
Sator served as Bob Johnson's assistant coach for Team USA on two Canada Cup teams and has sat on the Executive Board of USA Hockey. He was assistant coach with United States men's national ice hockey team in Vienna for the 1996 World Championships where the team took its first medal in 36 years.  Sator served as the head coach of the Slovenian national ice hockey team during the 2006-2007 season, bringing them back into the A Pool.  Later he obtained a position as the head coach of the Hungarian national ice hockey team from 2009 to 2011.

Coaching statistics (NHL head coach)

Coaching statistics (North American other)

Note: Sator was fired after 23 games in the 1986–87 season, and replaced by Tom Webster.
Note:  Sator was the Assistant Coach for Team USA in the Canada Cup in 1984 and 1987.

References

External links

1949 births
American ice hockey coaches
American men's ice hockey right wingers
Boston Bruins coaches
Bowling Green Falcons men's ice hockey players
Buffalo Sabres coaches
ECHL coaches
Hartford Whalers coaches
Ice hockey coaches from New York (state)
Lindenwood University people
Living people
New York Rangers coaches
People from New Hartford, New York
Philadelphia Flyers coaches
Philadelphia Flyers scouts
Slovenia men's national ice hockey team coaches
St. Louis Blues coaches
Vancouver Canucks coaches
Ice hockey players from New York (state)